Çayeli District is a district of the Rize Province of Turkey. Its seat is the town of Çayeli. Its area is 442 km2, and its population is 43,478 (2021).

Composition
There are three municipalities in Çayeli District:
 Büyükköy
 Çayeli
 Madenli

There are 52 villages in Çayeli District:

 Abdullahhoca
 Armutlu
 Aşıklar
 Başköy
 Beşikçiler
 Beyazsu
 Buzlupınar
 Çataldere
 Çeşmeli
 Çınartepe
 Çilingir
 Çukurluhoca
 Demirhisar
 Derecik
 Düzgeçit
 Erdemli
 Erenler
 Esendağ
 Gemiciler
 Gürgenli
 Gürpınar
 Güzeltepe
 Haremtepe
 Incesu
 Kaçkar
 Kaptanpaşa
 Karaağaç
 Kemerköy
 Kestanelik
 Köprübaşı
 Latifli
 Maltepe
 Musadağı
 Ormancık
 Ortaköy
 Sarısu
 Sefalı
 Selimiye
 Sırtköy
 Şirinköy
 Uzundere
 Yamaçköy
 Yanıkdağ
 Yavuzlar
 Yenice
 Yenihisar
 Yenitepe
 Yeşilırmak
 Yeşilköy
 Yeşiltepe
 Yıldızeli
 Zafer

References

Districts of Rize Province